WWE Extreme Rules is a professional wrestling event produced annually by WWE, a Connecticut-based promotion. It is broadcast live and available only through pay-per-view (PPV) and the livestreaming services Peacock and the WWE Network. The name of the event stems from various matches on the card being contested under hardcore wrestling regulations with generally one match being an Extreme Rules match, introduced at the 2010 event. The defunct Extreme Championship Wrestling promotion, which WWE acquired in 2003, originally used the "extreme rules" term to describe the regulations for all of its matches. 

The event name was established in 2009; however, its theme began with its predecessor, One Night Stand, which was promoted in 2005 and 2006 as an Extreme Championship Wrestling reunion show. In 2007, WWE promoted the show as one of its own regular pay-per-view events but kept the concept of hardcore-based matches. In 2009, WWE renamed the One Night Stand event to Extreme Rules. The 2009 Extreme Rules event was noted by WWE to be a direct continuation of the One Night Stand chronology. However, the 2010 event was later promoted as only the second event under a new chronology, one that is no longer a direct continuation of the One Night Stand events.

Starting in 2010, Extreme Rules was moved from June to late April/early May to replace Backlash as the post-WrestleMania pay-per-view event. For 2013, the event replaced Over the Limit as that year's May PPV. After the reinstated brand extension took effect in mid-2016, the event returned to the June slot of WWE's pay-per-view calendar in 2017 and was held as a Raw-exclusive pay-per-view event. Following WrestleMania 34 in 2018, however, all WWE pay-per-views ceased being brand exclusive, and Extreme Rules moved to the July slot. For the 2020 edition only, the event was titled The Horror Show at Extreme Rules. The 2021 event was then moved to September, replacing Clash of Champions. The 2022 event was moved to October and was the first time for the event to be held on a Saturday.

Concept and History
From 2005 to 2008, World Wrestling Entertainment (WWE) ran a pay-per-view (PPV) entitled One Night Stand. While originally a reunion show for the defunct Extreme Championship Wrestling promotion, the assets of which WWE acquired in 2003, the concept of One Night Stand was that the event featured various matches that were contested under hardcore rules. In 2009, Extreme Rules was established to replace One Night Stand and was initially noted by WWE to be a direct continuation of the One Night Stand chronology, with Extreme Rules continuing the concept of featuring hardcore-based matches. However, the 2010 event was later promoted as only the second event under a new chronology, one that is no longer a direct continuation of the One Night Stand events. The term "extreme rules" was originally used by Extreme Championship Wrestling to describe the regulations for all of its matches; WWE adopted the term and has since used it in place of "hardcore match" or "hardcore rules". In the mid-to-late 2010s, the amount of hardcore-based matches began decreasing, with only one included at the 2021 event, but the 2022 event returned to form with all six of its matches contested under a hardcore stipulation.

The 2009 Extreme Rules pay-per-view was the inaugural event of a now annual gimmick pay-per-view for WWE. It was held on June 7, 2009, at the New Orleans Arena in New Orleans, Louisiana. To coincide with the brand extension, in which the roster was divided into brands where wrestlers exclusively performed, the inaugural event featured wrestlers from the Raw, SmackDown, and ECW brands—it was the only to feature ECW as the brand disbanded in February 2010. The 2010 event then introduced the titular Extreme Rules match. This year's event also moved Extreme Rules up to the late April/early May slot to replace Backlash as the post-WrestleMania pay-per-view event.

In April 2011, WWE ceased using its full name with the "WWE" abbreviation becoming an orphaned initialism, and in August, the first brand extension was dissolved. The 2013 event then replaced Over the Limit for that year's May PPV. Beginning with the 2014 event, in addition to traditional PPV, Extreme Rules began broadcasting on WWE's online streaming service, the WWE Network, which launched earlier that year in February. After the 2016 event, WWE reintroduced the brand extension in July. Along with this second brand split came brand-exclusive PPVs, thus the 2017 event featured wrestlers exclusively from the Raw brand. It would in turn be the only Extreme Rules event during the second brand split to be a brand-exclusive show, as following WrestleMania 34 the following year, brand-exclusive pay-per-views were discontinued. The 2017 event also moved Extreme Rules back to the June slot, however, the 2018 event moved Extreme Rules to July. The 2019 event was held at the Wells Fargo Center in Philadelphia, Pennsylvania, the city that was the home of Extreme Championship Wrestling from 1993 to 2001.

Due to the COVID-19 pandemic, which began affecting the industry in mid-March 2020, WWE had to relocate its programming to a behind closed doors set. Raw and SmackDown's shows were moved to the WWE Performance Center in Orlando, Florida with no fans in attendance, although in late May, the promotion began using Performance Center trainees to serve as the live audience, which was further expanded to friends and family members of the wrestlers in mid-June. With the change in location and format, WWE titled the 2020 event as The Horror Show at Extreme Rules. It featured horror-themed matches, including the main event, which was a cinematically produced match, a Wyatt Swamp Fight between Bray Wyatt and Braun Strowman, a hardcore match held at a swamp.

The SAP Center in San Jose, California was originally to host the 2020 event, but due to the event's relocation as a result of the COVID-19 pandemic, the SAP Center announced that they would instead host the 2021 event. However, due to the ongoing pandemic, the 2021 event was reported to broadcast from WWE's bio-secure bubble, the WWE ThunderDome (introduced in August 2020), but that July date was instead given to Money in the Bank after WWE announced they would be returning to live touring in mid-July. It was then announced that the 2021 edition, which returned to the event's original name, would instead take place on September 26 at the Nationwide Arena in Columbus, Ohio, replacing Clash of Champions, which had originally been scheduled for that date and venue. The 2021 event was also the first Extreme Rules to air on Peacock's WWE Network channel, following the merger of the American version of the WWE Network under Peacock in March that year.

In June 2022, WWE announced that the 2022 Extreme Rules would be held on October 8 and return the event to the Wells Fargo Center in Philadelphia, Pennsylvania. This marked the first Extreme Rules to be held in October and on a Saturday.

Extreme Rules matches
An "Extreme Rules match" is a type of hardcore match in which there are no disqualifications and no countouts and weapons are incentivized, but pinfalls and submissions must take place in the ring; since the acquisition of Extreme Championship Wrestling, WWE has used the "Extreme Rules" term in place of "hardcore". Although the Extreme Rules event was established in 2009, it was not until 2010 when the titular Extreme Rules match began to be held at the annual event. Only two other Extreme Rules events thus far have not included an Extreme Rules match, which were the 2011 and 2015 events.

Since being introduced at the 2010 event, the events that have included an Extreme Rules match thus far have only had one Extreme Rules match on the card. The other matches are another type of hardcore match or just standard rules matches. Some of the other hardcore matches may have technically had the same or very similar rules as an Extreme Rules match, but were not stipulated as such (for example, a No Holds Barred match, which was held at the inaugural 2009 event). Some Extreme Rules matches have had other stipulations applied on top of the Extreme Rules stipulation.

Other types of hardcore matches to have taken place at Extreme Rules include Steel Cage matches, variants of the Strap match, Ladder matches, Street Fights, Last Man Standing matches, tables matches, "I Quit" matches, No Disqualification matches, a Kendo stick-on-a-Pole match, an Eye for an Eye match (one opponent had to extract an eye from the other opponent), a Wyatt Swamp Fight, a Good Old Fashioned Donnybrook match, and a Fight Pit match.

The following are the Extreme Rules matches that have been held at the annual event.

Events

Notes
1

References

External links

WWE Extreme Rules
Recurring events established in 2009